Saru may refer to:

Places 
Iran
 Saru, ancient name of Sari, Iran
 Saru, Fars, a village in Fars Province, Iran
 Saru, Mazandaran, a village in Mazandaran Province, Iran
 Saru, Semnan, a village in Semnan Province, Iran
 Saru castles in Semnan
Japan
 Saru River, river in Hokkaidō
 Saru District, Hokkaidō
 Mount Saru, in the Hidaka Mountains, Hokkaidō

Romania
 Șaru Dornei, a commune located in Suceava County, Romania
 Saru, a village in Valea Mare Commune, Dâmbovița County, Romania

Elsewhere
 Saru, Estonia, village in Mõniste Parish, Võru County, Estonia

Sports 
 South African Rugby Union (SACOS) (founded 1966), the former South African Coloured Rugby Football Board and founder member in 1973 of the South African Council on Sport the non-racial anti-apartheid organization
 South African Rugby Union (founded 1992), the governing body for rugby union in South Africa which emerged from the unification of the South African Rugby Board and the South African Rugby Union

Other uses 
 SARU-3, a space fortress in Ape Escape 3
 George Saru (1920–2003), a Romanian-American painter
 Saru (Star Trek), a fictional character in the television series Star Trek: Discovery

See also 
 Sarutobi (disambiguation)
 Sarus (disambiguation)